Koba Shalamberidze (Georgian: კობა შალამბერიძე; born 15 October 1984 in Kutaisi) is a Georgian professional footballer who most recently played as a midfielder for Odra Wodzisław.

Career

Club
He started his football career at Umaglesi Liga club Spartaki Tbilisi. He also played in the Dinamo Tbilisi, Torpedo Kutaisi, Dinamo Batumi, Meshakre Agara, Ameri Tbilisi, Sioni Bolnisi, Spartaki Tskhinvali, as well as Polish clubs Odra Wodzisław and Flota Świnoujście.

Personal life
Born in Kutaisi, a town in Imereti Province.

Honours
Ameri Tbilisi
Georgian Super Cup: 2007

External links
 
 
 

1984 births
Living people
Footballers from Georgia (country)
Expatriate footballers from Georgia (country)
Odra Wodzisław Śląski players
Expatriate footballers in Poland
Association football midfielders
FC Dinamo Batumi players
Flota Świnoujście players
Expatriate sportspeople from Georgia (country) in Poland
FC Sioni Bolnisi players
FC Guria Lanchkhuti players
FC Spartaki Tskhinvali players
FC Gagra players
Ekstraklasa players
I liga players
III liga players
Sportspeople from Kutaisi